Remembrance is a British ensemble drama about Royal Navy ratings of HMS Raleigh, who are about to embark on a six-month naval exercise. The film is noteworthy for early appearances of several well-known British actors, including Timothy Spall, Lisa Maxwell and John Altman and it was Gary Oldman's film debut. It was an early production from Channel Four Films and was shown on 10 November 1982 on Channel 4. It was also one of the first films in the UK to be shown on television less than three years after its initial cinema release (a delay enforced at the time by the Cinema Exhibitors' Association).

Plot
The film does not have a simple plot, but rather cuts between the interweaving stories of several characters, as they prepare for the coming months away at sea. The action centres around the bars and clubs of the Union Street district of Plymouth. One major event that affects all the characters is the hospitalisation and eventual death of Daniel (Gary Oldman) after a violent assault by a nightclub bouncer.

Production
Gregg got the idea for the film from his own experiences as a student at Plymouth Art College. It was largely shot on location, including interior scenes in two Union Street pubs, The Phoenix and The Two Trees.

The film was commissioned by Channel 4, before the channel had started broadcasting and was aired in the first week of the new channel in early November 1982, close to Remembrance Sunday.

Unusually for the time, the film had been given a cinema preview in June 1982 at the Screen on the Hill cinema in Hampstead. This was a purely opportunistic enterprise, taking advantage of the prominent role that the Royal Navy had played in the Falklands War to gain publicity for the film (and the upcoming launch of Channel 4), but it turned out to be a significant event in the relationship between cinema and television in the UK. In Independent Television in Britain (Volume 6, 2003), Paul Bonner and Lesley Aston note that:

Cast

Soundtrack
The film uses Aragon by Brian Eno as incidental music.

Reception
Channel 4's regulator, the Independent Broadcasting Authority (IBA), raised concerns about gratuitous use of swearing in the script. The film won the Golden Charybdis Award at the 1982 Taormina International Film Festival.

References

External links

Remembrance at the BFI

1982 films
British drama films
Films set in Devon
Films shot in Devon
1980s English-language films
1980s British films